Reynold from the kindred Rátót (died after 1238) was a Hungarian distinguished nobleman from the gens Rátót, who served as ispán (comes) of Veszprém County from 1237 to 1238.

Career
Formerly, historian Pál Engel identified him as Reynold from the kindred Básztély, although Mór Wertner had doubted in the truthful of that identification in the previous century. Moreover, Reynold's seal (1237) refers to his origin from the kindred Rátót. He had a brother Norbert, also ispán of Veszprém County later.

In 1237, Reynold (or Regnald) judged over a lawsuit between the cathedral chapter of Veszprém and a local noble, Keselő Gyipolti.

References

Sources

 
 
 

Reynold
13th-century Hungarian people